Crows Fly Black is the seventh album by Finnish heavy metal band Tarot, released on 27 October 2006. This album is accompanied by the single "You", and the music video "Ashes to the Stars". This is the first album to officially acknowledge Tommi 'Tumple' Salmela as a member of the band, referred to as an 'old-new' member; until then, Tommi's role was limited to sampling and backing vocals, while in this album, Tommi takes role of fully fledged vocalist.

Track listing
 Crows Fly Black - 6:31
 Traitor - 3:38
 Ashes to the Stars - 5:25
 Messenger of Gods - 4:23
 Before the Skies Come Down - 4:06
 Tides - 5:33
 Bleeding Dust - 4:23
 You - 3:44
 Howl! - 4:22
 Grey - 4:49
 *Veteran of Psychic Wars (Bonus Track) - 5:06

Charts

Personnel
Tarot
Marko Hietala – vocals & backing vocals, bass, acoustic guitar
Zachary Hietala – guitars
Janne Tolsa – keyboards
Pecu Cinnari – drums
Tommi Salmela – samples, vocals & backing vocals

Guest musicians
Emppu Vuorinen (Nightwish) – guitar solo on "Traitor"
MC Raaka Pee (Turmion Kätilöt) – backing vocals

References 

2006 albums
Tarot (band) albums